American rapper and singer Doja Cat has received many accolades throughout her career, including one Grammy Award, five Billboard Music Awards, five American Music Awards (AMAs), and three MTV Video Music Awards (VMAs).

After the largely ignored rollout of her debut studio album, Amala (2018), Doja Cat released Hot Pink on November 7, 2019, through Kemosabe and RCA Records. It received nominations for Favorite Soul/R&B Album at the 48th annual AMAs, and Top R&B Album at the 2021 Billboard Music Awards. Its lead single—a remix of "Juicy" featuring rapper Tyga—was her first entry into Billboard Hot 100 chart, and was nominated for Top R&B Song at the 2020 Billboard Music Awards. "Say So", another single from Hot Pink, reached number one on the Hot 100 following a remix with rapper Nicki Minaj, which gave Minaj and Doja Cat a Guinness World Record for becoming the first female rap duo to top the chart. "Say So" received a Song of the Year nomination at the 2020 VMAs. During the same year, its music video was nominated for a "Video of the Year" accolade two times: from the AMAs and the BET Awards. In 2021, "Say So" received multiple nominations, including Record of the Year and Best Pop Solo Performance at the 63rd Annual Grammy Awards, TikTok Bop of the Year at the year's iHeartRadio Music Awards, and Top R&B Song at the Billboard Music Awards. Awarded 1 iHeartRadio Music Awards along with the accomplishment of reaching 1 Billion Total Audience Spins for “Kiss Me More” ft SZA & “Need To Know”.



Awards and nominations

Notes

References 

Awards
Doja Cat